Erwin Baur (16 April 1875, in Ichenheim, Grand Duchy of Baden – 2 December 1933) was a German geneticist and botanist. Baur worked primarily on plant genetics. He was director of the Kaiser Wilhelm Institute for Breeding Research (since 1938 Erwin Baur-Institute). Baur is considered to be the father of plant virology. He discovered the inheritance of plastids.

In 1908 Baur demonstrated a lethal gene in the Antirrhinum plant. In 1909 working on the chloroplast genes in Pelargonium (geraniums) he showed that they violated four of Mendel's five laws.
Baur stated that
plastids are carriers of hereditary factors which are able to mutate.
in variegated plants, random sorting out of plastids is taking place.
the genetic results indicate a biparental inheritance of plastids by egg cells and sperm cells in pelargonium.

Since the 1930s and the work of Otto Renner, plastid inheritance became a widely accepted genetic theory.

In 1921 and 1932, together with Fritz Lenz and Eugen Fischer, Baur coauthored two volumes that became the book Menschliche Erblichkeitslehre (Human Heredity), which was a major influence on the racial theories of Adolf Hitler. The work served a chief inspiration for biological support in Hitler's Mein Kampf.

References

External links
 Short Biography, bibliography, and links on digitized sources in the Virtual Laboratory of the Max Planck Institute for the History of Science

1875 births
1933 deaths
People from Ortenaukreis
People from the Grand Duchy of Baden
20th-century German botanists
German geneticists
Max Planck Institute directors